Philip John Burnell (born 12 June 1945) is a former English first-class cricketer.

Burnell was born at Woodford Green in June 1945 and later studied at Oriel College, Oxford. While studying at Oxford, he played first-class cricket for Oxford University on six occasions as a wicket-keeper in 1967, scoring 71 runs with a high score of 28, in addition to taking three catches and making a single stumping.

References

External links

1945 births
Living people
People from Oxford
Alumni of Oriel College, Oxford
English cricketers
Oxford University cricketers